Nirmon is a Goan Konkani film produced in 1966. It was directed by A. Salam and produced by Frank Fernand. The film features C. Alvares, Shalini, Anthony D’Sa, Ophelia, Souza Ferrao, Antonette and Jacinto Vaz.

Cast and crew

Nirmonn was Frank Fernand's second production. It had story and direction of A. Salam and music by Frank Fernand himself, dialogues by C. Alvares, screenplay and editing by R. V. Shirkhande. The film stars Shalini Mardolkar, C. Alvares, Anthony D'Sa, Jacint Vaz, Antonette Mendes, Ophelia, Jack Souza Ferrao and J. P. Souzalin.

Inspiration

Nirmonn is based on Lord Tennyson's character from the 1864 poem Enoch Arden.

Remake

In 1967, it was remade into the Bollywood movie Taqdeer, in which Shalini Mardolkar acted the lead role as in the original film. Taqdeer, produced by Rajshri Productions was dubbed into seven other languages. The Hindi film was also directed by A. Salam.

Awards

The film won two National Awards at the hands of India’s then Prime Minister Indira Gandhi. C. Alvares (Celestino Alvares), known as the "King of Duets" received the award for best actor in the Konkani film Nirmon. This film had a powerful story and won the Certificate of Merit for regional films at the 13th National Film Awards, the first of its kind for Konkani.

Music

The songs of Nirmon have also become immortal. The music was released on Angel Records under EMI of The Gramophone Company of India, and also manufactured and distributed by The Gramophone Company.

References

External links

1966 films
Films based on Enoch Arden
1960s Konkani-language films